RC Leuven is a Belgian rugby club in Leuven.

History
The club was founded in 1983.

External links
 RC Leuven

Belgian rugby union clubs
Rugby clubs established in 1983
Rugby Club Leuven